North Mountain is an unincorporated community in Berkeley County, West Virginia, United States. It takes its name from North Mountain, which lies to its west. The community of North Mountain is located on West Virginia Route 901 northeast of Hedgesville.

Unincorporated communities in Berkeley County, West Virginia
Unincorporated communities in West Virginia